Bola, or Bakovi, is an Oceanic language of West New Britain in Papua New Guinea. The Harua (Xarua) dialect developed on a palm plantation.

Phonology 
Phonology of the Bola language:

The voiced stops  can often sound prenasalized  among various speakers.  can be pronounced as a glottal fricative  among younger speakers.

 before vowel sounds  is pronounced as a glide sound .

References

Further reading

External links
 Organised Phonology Data
 Genesis, Exodus, Leviticus, Numbers, Deuteronomy, Joshua, Ruth, Jonah, and the New Testament in the Bola language of Papua New Guinea

Meso-Melanesian languages
Languages of West New Britain Province